Sharq El Owainat is located in the New Valley Governorate of Egypt. It is in the south-west of the country, between the Nile and Libya.

Along with Toshka, Sharq El Owainat forms part of the larger New Valley Project which consists of building a system of canals to transport water from Lake Nasser to irrigate the Western Desert of Egypt.

The Sharq El Owainat project is part of Egyptian President Hosni Mubarak's election programme over the past decade and was inaugurated in 2001. It was introduced as the hope for future generations to escape the crowded and limited valley of the River Nile and establish new communities in the western desert. The project aims to attract investors to cultivate an eventual 240,000 feddans by 2017.

The initial phase of the project resulted in 27,000 feddans of barren desert land was converted to fertile land. There are about 400 water wells in the area with a further 250 under construction. There is also a nursery that includes 26 greenhouses.

Different agricultural ventures are being carried out, many of the high yield produce of the area are meant for exportation (mainly to Europe).

The area has its own hospital, police station, telephone lines and television transmission. A power plant is current under construction in addition to a livestock slaughter house and meat processing unit.

In August 2009, the UAE-based agricultural company, Janan, agreed a contract to cultivate 100,000 feddans (about 42,000 hectares) of land with wheat, corn, and feed. This contract also included signing an agreement with the national airline of Egypt, EgyptAir Express (subsidiary of EgyptAir), to operate a weekly flight from Cairo International Airport to Sharq El Owainat Airport in order to serve the movement of workers and investors to encourage agricultural investment in the region. The flights began 1 November 2009 for an initial 1-year period.

See also
Sharq El Owainat Airport
New Valley Governorate
Toshka
New Valley Project

References 

New Valley Governorate
Geography of Egypt
Agriculture in Egypt
Interbasin transfer